Neverita aulacoglossa is a species of sea snail, a marine gastropod mollusc in the family Naticidae, the moons snails.

References

 Powell A. W. B., New Zealand Mollusca, William Collins Publishers Ltd, Auckland, New Zealand 1979 
 Torigoe K. & Inaba A. (2011) Revision on the classification of Recent Naticidae. Bulletin of the Nishinomiya Shell Museum 7: 133 + 15 pp., 4 pls.

External links
  Huelsken T., Tapken D., Dahlmann T., Wägele H., Riginos C. & Hollmann M. (2012) Systematics and phylogenetic species delimitation within Polinices s.l. (Caenogastropoda: Naticidae) based on molecular data and shell morphology. Organisms, Diversity & Evolution 12: 349-375

Naticidae
Gastropods of New Zealand
Gastropods described in 1909